The CNMI Republican Party is a political party in the Northern Mariana Islands. The Northern Mariana Islands Republican Party is now associated with the United States Republican Party though no Northern Mariana Islands politicians have achieved high-ranking positions in the mainland United States.

History
In the 2001 gubernatorial election Juan Babauta of the Republican Party won with 42.8% of the vote. At the legislative elections of November 1, 2003 the party won 7 out of 18 seats in the House of Representatives.

In 2004, the CNMI Republican party gained recognition on the island of Tinian. At the gubernatorial elections of November 6, 2005, Governor Juan Babauta was defeated, receiving 26% of the vote and third place. In the 2005 legislative elections held concurrently, the Republicans took 7 of 18 seats in the House of Representatives and 3 of 9 seats in the Senate. In the November 3, 2007 Commonwealth Legislature elections, the party took 12 of 20 seats in the House of Representatives, giving them a strong majority.

The Republican Party in the Northern Mariana Islands is much stronger than the Democratic Party, but the Conservative Covenant Party, which only exists in the Northern Mariana Islands, has become the main competitor for the Republican Party on the islands and defeated the Republican Party in the last elections by taking the governorship.

However, in 2013, the governor, Eloy S. Inos, switched party affiliation from the Covenant Party to the Republican Party, thus making the governorship controlled by the Republican Party. In 2014, Senator Frank M. Borja reported that the GOP on Tinian was in disarray because most islanders were affiliated with the party.

Positions
The CNMI Republican administration has stated that it does not want to get involved in national US debates on subjects such as immigration because of the CNMI's unique situation in United States politics.
Despite their position on national politics, the CNMI government—which had a super-majority in the House and Senate in 2016—attempted to push for gun bans.  When the gun ban was found unconstitutional, the CNMI government pushed for a $1000 excise tax, which was also found unconstitutional.

References

External links
 Facebook page

Political parties in the Northern Mariana Islands
Northern Mariana Islands